The 1998–99 Euroleague Women was the third edition of the Euroleague era of FIBA's premier international competition for European women's basketball clubs. It ran between 23 September 1998 and 8 April 1999.

MBK Ruzomberok won its first title beating former champion Pool Comense in the final, becoming the first (and only to date) Slovak team to win the competition. Galatasaray and BTV Wuppertal also reached the Final Four, which took place in Brno, while defending champion CJM Bourges was knocked out by Ruzomberok in the quarterfinals.

Group stage

Group A

Group B

Quarter-finals

Final four
 Brno, Czech Republic

Individual statistics

Points

Rebounds

Assists

References

EuroLeague Women seasons